"Walk This Road" is a single by Canadian folk music artist Bruce Guthro. Released in 1997, it was the first single from Guthro's Of Your Son album. The song reached #1 on the RPM Country Tracks chart in February 1998 and also reached #16 on the RPM Adult Contemporary Tracks chart.

Chart performance

Year-end charts

References

1997 singles
Bruce Guthro songs
1997 songs
EMI Records singles